The Changshou Yangtze River Bridge  is a cable-stayed bridge over the Yangtze River in the Changshou District of Chongqing, China.

Bridge construction began in 2005 and the bridge was completed in 2009.

See also
List of largest cable-stayed bridges
Yangtze River bridges and tunnels

References

2009 establishments in China
Bridges completed in 2009
Bridges in Chongqing
Bridges over the Yangtze River
Cable-stayed bridges in China
Road bridges in China